LaToy Williams (born 28 May 1988) in Freeport, Bahamas is a Bahamian sprint athlete mainly competing in the 400m. He was part of the 4 × 400 m relay team at the 2009 and 2011 IAAF World Championships in Athletics.

Career

He retired in 2017 and since became a family life teacher at Bishop Michael Eldon School
Williams competed in collegiate track at South Plains College and Texas Tech University

Personal bests

References

External links
 Texas Tech Profile
 World Athletics

1988 births
Living people
Bahamian male sprinters
Texas Tech University alumni
South Plains College alumni
Junior college men's track and field athletes in the United States
Texas Tech Red Raiders men's track and field athletes
Athletes (track and field) at the 2014 Commonwealth Games
Athletes (track and field) at the 2015 Pan American Games
Pan American Games competitors for the Bahamas
People from Freeport, Bahamas
Commonwealth Games medallists in athletics
Commonwealth Games silver medallists for the Bahamas
Medallists at the 2014 Commonwealth Games